Simona Senoner (13 June 1993 – 7 January 2011) was an Italian cross-country racer and ski jumper.

Biography
Senoner was born in Bolzano, in the province of South Tyrol, and lived in Santa Cristina Gherdëina, in the Ladin-speaking territory of the province. From 2008 to her death she was a member of the Italian ski jumper team. She was a niece of Italian skier Peter Runggaldier.

Death
At the time of her death she was competing in the Continental Cup meet. After suddenly falling ill in her hotel room, she was airlifted to University Medical Center Freiburg, where she was pronounced dead after about 24 hours. Initial tests indicated she may have died from a rapid onset of meningitis. As a tribute, all Italian winter sports athletes wore black armbands the following Sunday.

References

External links 

Sci Club Gardena Cassa Raiffeisen de Sëlva
Simona Senoner passed away
Sci, l'azzurra 17enne Simona Senoner muore dopo un malore in ritiro
Simona Senoner on FIS website

1993 births
2011 deaths
Ladin people
Italian female ski jumpers
Sportspeople from Bolzano
Neurological disease deaths in Germany
Infectious disease deaths in Germany
Deaths from meningitis
20th-century Italian women
21st-century Italian women